Valeri Zentsov (born 31 August 1946 in Berlin, russian Валерий Зенцов) is a Russian spy best known for recruiting Herman Simm in 1995.

After joining KGB in 1969, he was assigned to study spycraft in Moscow in 1973–1975, specialising in scientific and technological espionage. Subsequently, Zentsov was based in Estonia where he made relatively fast career, becoming the vice head of intelligence of the KGB branch in Estonia by 1988. Following restoration of Republic of Estonia, Zentsov was in 1992 classified as a Russian military retiree ranking as a polkovnik, and as of 1998, Russia paid him a military pension of 1291.54 roubles per month. However, according to Kaitsepolitsei, instead of retiring Zentsov continued clandestine work for the Sluzhba Vneshney Razvedki, the foreign intelligence successor of KGB.

In 1999, Estonia denied Zentsov extension of residence permit based on his employment as commissioned officer of foreign (i. e. Soviet) military.  After expiration of his last residence permit, he illegally resided in Estonia for 57 days, leading to his forced removal from the country by immigration authorities.

References 

1946 births
Living people
Soviet spies
People of the KGB
Russian spies